Yekutiel Gershoni (1943 – 14 July 2021) was an Israeli historian and paralympic champion.

Gershoni was born in Rishon LeZion, Mandatory Palestine, in 1943. He began his military service in the Israel Defense Forces in 1961, and became an officer in the Combat Engineering Corps. In November 1969, while a Captain in the Engineering Corps, he was severely injured while trying to dismantle a mine operated from a distance, which exploded, severely injuring him. His arms had to be amputated, and his vision and hearing were also severely impaired.

A year after his injury, Gershoni began studying Middle Eastern studies and African studies at Tel Aviv University. He completed with honors his two degrees and completed his PhD in 1982 from the Hebrew University of Jerusalem.

Gershoni developed an academic career despite facing challenges when writing his publications. During 2000 - 2004 he was head of the department for Middle Eastern and African studies at Tel Aviv University, in which he was promoted to the rank of professor in 1995. In 2001–02 he was President of the International Association for Liberian Studies. Gershoni was also used as assistant researcher and lecturer at Stanford University, Boston University and Indiana University. He was awarded an honorary doctorate by Ben-Gurion University of the Negev in 2010.

Gershoni was active in disabled sports, competing at the 1980 and 1984 Paralympic Games in running and in long jump.

Gershoni was married and had three children. He died at the age of 78 on 14 July 2021.

References

External links
 Gershoni's homepage
 

1943 births
2021 deaths
Israeli male long jumpers
Israeli male sprinters
Israeli male middle-distance runners
Paralympic athletes of Israel
Athletes (track and field) at the 1980 Summer Paralympics
Athletes (track and field) at the 1984 Summer Paralympics
Paralympic bronze medalists for Israel
Paralympic silver medalists for Israel
Academic staff of Tel Aviv University
Medalists at the 1980 Summer Paralympics
Medalists at the 1984 Summer Paralympics
Visually impaired sprinters
Sprinters with limb difference
Visually impaired long jumpers
Long jumpers with limb difference
Visually impaired middle-distance runners
Middle-distance runners with limb difference
Paralympic medalists in athletics (track and field)
Paralympic sprinters
Paralympic long jumpers
Paralympic middle-distance runners
Tel Aviv University alumni
Israeli soldiers
Israeli amputees
Landmine victims
Sportspeople from Rishon LeZion
Hebrew University of Jerusalem alumni
Male competitors in athletics with disabilities
20th-century Israeli engineers
20th-century Israeli historians
21st-century Israeli historians
Blind academics